WD repeat-containing protein 1 is a protein that in humans is encoded by the WDR1 gene.

This gene encodes a protein containing 9 WD repeats. WD repeats are approximately 30- to 40-amino acid domains containing several conserved residues, mostly including a trp-asp at the C-terminal end. WD domains are involved in protein-protein interactions. The encoded protein may help induce the disassembly of actin filaments. Two transcript variants encoding different isoforms have been found for this gene.

References

Further reading